Mariebergs SK is a Swedish football club located in Stockholm.

Background
Mariebergs SK currently plays in Division 4 Stockholm Mellersta which is the sixth tier of Swedish football. They play their home matches at the Stadshagens IP in Stockholm. The team is today managed by Jonathan Svensson and his assistant coaches Michael Jonsson and Nils Envald. 

The club is affiliated to Stockholms Fotbollförbund.

Season to season

Footnotes

External links
 Mariebergs SK – Official website
 Mariebergs SK on Facebook

Football clubs in Stockholm